The 2017 Arizona Diamondbacks season was the franchise's 19th season in Major League Baseball and their 19th season at Chase Field and in Phoenix, Arizona. They began the season on April 2 at home against the San Francisco Giants. The Diamondbacks finished the season 93–69 to finish in second place in the National League West Division, 11 games behind the Los Angeles Dodgers. They also flipped their record from the previous year, in which they went 69-93.   

On September 24, the Diamondbacks clinched a Wild Card berth with losses by the Milwaukee Brewers and the St. Louis Cardinals. They also clinched home field for the Wild Card game after a 3–2 walk-off victory over the Miami Marlins. This marked the first trip to the playoffs for the Diamondbacks since 2011. In the Wild Card Game, they defeated the Colorado Rockies to advance the National League Division Series against the Los Angeles Dodgers. The Diamondbacks were then swept by the Dodgers in three games, ending their postseason run.

Offseason and spring training
During their pre-season spring training, the Diamondbacks participated in the Cactus League, finishing with a 15–15 win–loss record. They also played two tied games that were not included in the standings.

Regular season
Facing the Los Angeles Dodgers on September 4, Diamondbacks outfielder J. D. Martinez became the 18th player in MLB history to hit four home runs in a game. This performance meant that the Diamondbacks became the first team ever to have had a 20-strikeout game in nine innings (Randy Johnson, 2001), a perfect game (Johnson again, 2004) and a four-homer game (Martinez).

Season standings

National League West

National League Wild Card

Record vs. opponents

Game log

|- style="background:#cfc"
| 1 || April 2 || Giants || 6–5 || Rodney (1–0) || Melancon (0–1) || — || 49,016 || 1–0 || W1
|- style="background:#fbb"
| 2 || April 4 || Giants || 4–8 || Cueto (1–0) || Corbin (0–1) || — || 19,378 || 1–1 || L1
|- style="background:#cfc"
| 3 || April 5 || Giants || 8–6 || Walker (1–0) || Moore (0–1) || Rodney (1) || 14,675 || 2–1 || W1
|- style="background:#cfc"
| 4 || April 6 || Giants || 9–3 || De La Rosa (1–0) || Samardzija (0–1) || — || 15,308 || 3–1 || W2
|- style="background:#cfc"
| 5 || April 7 || Indians || 7–3 || Miller (1–0) || Tomlin (0–1) || — || 22,443 || 4–1 || W3
|- style="background:#cfc"
| 6 || April 8 || Indians || 11–2 || Greinke (1–0) || Bauer (0–1) || — || 28,437 || 5–1 || W4
|- style="background:#cfc"
| 7 || April 9 || Indians || 3–2 || Corbin (1–1) || Kluber (0–1) || Rodney (2) || 30,191 || 6–1 || W5
|- style="background:#fbb"
| 8 || April 10 || @ Giants || 1–4 || Moore (1–1) || Walker (1–1) || — || 42,129 || 6–2 || L1
|- style="background:#cfc"
| 9 || April 11 || @ Giants || 4–3 || Ray (1–0) || Samardzija (0–2) || Rodney (3) || 41,562 || 7–2 || W1
|- style="background:#fbb"
| 10 || April 12 || @ Giants || 2–6 || Cain (1–0) || Miller (1–1) || — || 41,656 || 7–3 || L1
|- style="background:#fbb"
| 11 || April 14 || @ Dodgers || 1–7 || Kershaw (2–1) || Greinke (1–1) || — || 49,438 || 7–4 || L2
|- style="background:#fbb"
| 12 || April 15 || @ Dodgers || 4–8 || Wood (1–0) || Corbin (1–2) || Jansen (3) || 48,070 || 7–5 || L3
|- style="background:#cfc"
| 13 || April 16 || @ Dodgers || 3–1 ||Walker (2–1) || Hill (1–1) || Rodney (4) || 39,822 || 8–5 || W1
|- style="background:#cfc"
| 14 || April 17 || @ Dodgers || 4–2 || Hoover (1–0) || Hatcher (0–1) || Rodney (5) || 35,448 || 9–5 || W2
|- style="background:#cfc"
| 15 || April 18 || @ Padres || 11–2 || Miller (2–1) || Cosart (0–1) || — || 19,869 || 10–5 || W3
|- style="background:#fbb"
| 16 || April 19 || @ Padres || 0–1 || Chacín (2–2) || Greinke (1–2) || Maurer (2) || 17,089 || 10–6 || L1
|- style="background:#fbb"
| 17 || April 20 || @ Padres || 1–4 || Richard (2–2) || Corbin (2–2) || Maurer (3) || 17,831 || 10–7 || L2
|- style="background:#cfc"
| 18 || April 21 || Dodgers || 13–5 || Bradley (1–0) || Stripling (0–1) || — ||27,018 || 11–7 || W1
|- style="background:#cfc"
| 19 || April 22 || Dodgers || 11–5 || Ray (2–0) || Maeda (1–2) || — || 36,294 || 12–7 || W2
|- style="background:#fbb"
| 20 || April 23 || Dodgers || 2–6 || McCarthy (3–0) || Miller (2–2) || — || 28,704 || 12–8 || L1
|- style="background:#cfc"
| 21 || April 24 || Padres || 7–6 || Greinke (2–2) || Chacín (2–3) || Rodney (6) || 14,758 || 13–8 || W1
|- style="background:#cfc"
| 22 || April 25 || Padres || 9–3 || Corbin (3–2) || Richard (2–3) || — || 17,531 || 14–8 || W2
|- style="background:#fbb"
| 23 || April 26 || Padres || 5–8 || Buchter (1–0) || Rodney (1–1) || Maurer (4) || 12,215 || 14–9 || L1
|- style="background:#cfc"
| 24 || April 27 || Padres || 6–2 || Walker (3–1) || Weaver (0–2) || — || 15,452 || 15–9 || W1
|- style="background:#fbb"
| 25 || April 28 || Rockies || 1–3 || Freeland (3–1) || Ray (2–1) || Holland (10) || 19,300 || 15–10 ||L1
|- style="background:#fbb"
| 26 || April 29 || Rockies || 6–7 || Estévez (3–0) || Rodney (1–2) || Holland (11) || 30,445 || 15–11 || L2
|- style="background:#cfc"
| 27 || April 30 || Rockies || 2–0 (13) || Delgado (1–0) || Lyles (0–1) || — || 23,613 || 16–11 || W1
|-

|- style="background:#cfc"
| 28 || May 2 ||@ Nationals || 6–3 || McFarland (1–0) || Roark (3–1) || Rodney (7) || 22,826 || 17–11 || W2
|- style="background:#fbb"
| 29 || May 3 || @ Nationals || 1–2 || Turner (1–0) || Ray (2–2) || — || 23,816 || 17–12 || L1
|- style="background:#fbb"
| 30 || May 4 || @ Nationals || 2–4 || Scherzer (4–2) || Shipley (0–1) || Romero (1)|| 29,496 || 17–13 || L2
|- style="Background:#cfc"
| 31 || May 5 || @ Rockies ||6–3 ||Greinke (3–2)|| Márquez (0–2) || Rodney (8) || 30,030 || 18–13 || W1
|- style="background:#fbb"
| 32 || May 6 || @ Rockies ||1–9 || Anderson (2–3) || Corbin (2–4) || — || 36,165 || 18–14 || L1
|- style="background:#fbb"
| 33 || May 7 || @ Rockies ||2–5 ||Chatwood (3–4) || Walker (3–2) || Holland (13) ||39,175 ||18–15 ||L2
|- style="background:#fbb"
| 34 || May 9 || Tigers ||3–7 ||Verlander (3–2) ||Ray (3–2) || — ||20,445 ||18–16 ||L3
|- style="background:#cfc"
| 35 || May 10 || Tigers ||7–1 ||Godley (1–0) ||Boyd(3–2) || — ||18,897 ||19–16 ||W1
|- style="background:#cfc"
| 36 || May 11 || Pirates ||2–1 ||Greinke (4–2) ||Cole (1–4) ||Rodney (9) ||17,527 ||20–16 ||W2
|- style="background:#cfc"
| 37 || May 12 || Pirates ||11–4 ||Corbin (3–4) ||Glasnow (1–3) || — ||21,911 ||21–16 ||W3
|- style="background:#fbb"
| 38 || May 13 || Pirates ||3–4 ||Williams (1–2) ||Walker (3–3) || Watson (8) ||31,673 ||21–17 ||L1
|- style="background:#fbb"
| 39 || May 14 || Pirates ||4–6 ||Watson (2–0) ||Wilhelmsen (0–1) || — ||34,088 ||21–18 ||L2
|- style="background:#cfc"
| 40 || May 15|| Mets ||7–3 ||De La Rosa (2–0) ||Robles (4–1) || — ||15,988 ||22–18 ||W1
|- style="background:#cfc"
| 41 || May 16 || Mets ||5–4 ||Greinke(5–2) ||Milone (1–1) ||Rodney (10) ||17,471 ||23–18 ||W2
|- style="background:#cfc "
| 42 || May 17 || Mets ||5–4 ||Wilhelmsen (1–1) ||Montero (0–3) || — ||19,842 ||24–18 ||W3
|- style="background:#cfc"
| 43|| May 19 || @ Padres ||10–1 ||Walker (4–3)||Weaver (0–5)||Delgado (1)||22,187 || 25–18 || W4
|- style="background:#cfc"
| 44 || May 20 || @ Padres ||9–1 ||Ray (3–3)|| Perdomo (0–1) || — || 29,969|| 26–18 || W5
|- style="background:#fbb"
| 45 || May 21 || @ Padres ||1–5 ||Richard (3–5)|| Godley (1–1) || — || 27,198 || 26–19 || L1
|- style="background:#cfc"
| 46 || May 22 || White Sox ||5–1 || Greinke (6–2)|| González (3–5)|| — || 18,333 || 27–19 || W1
|- style="background:#cfc"
| 47 || May 23 || White Sox||5–4 || Corbin (4–4) || Covey (0–4) || Rodney (11) || 17,865 || 28–19 || W2
|- style="background:#cfc"
| 48 || May 24 || White Sox ||8–6 || Chafin (1–0) || Quintana (2–6) || Rodney (12) || 18,002 || 29–19 || W3
|- style="background:#cfc"
| 49 || May 25 || @ Brewers ||4–0 || Ray (4–3) || Davies (5–3) || — || 30,081 || 30–19 || W4
|- style="background:#cfc"
| 50 || May 26 || @ Brewers ||4–2 (10) || McFarland (2–0) || Peralta (5–3) || Rodney  (13) || 25,391 || 31–19 || W5
|- style="background:#fbb"
| 51 || May 27 || @ Brewers ||1–6 || Anderson (3–1) || Greinke  (6–3) || — || 29,746 || 31–20 || L1
|- style="background:#fbb"
| 52 || May 28 || @ Brewers ||5–9 || Nelson (3–3) ||  Corbin  (4–5) || Barnes(2) || 41,698 || 31–21 || L2
|- style="background:#fbb"
| 53 || May 29 || @ Pirates || 3–4 || Watson (4–1) || Bradley (1–1) || — || 16,939 || 31–22 ||L3
|- style="background:#cfc"
| 54 || May 30 || @ Pirates ||3–0 || Ray (5–3) || Nova (5–4) || — || 14,996 ||32–22 ||W1
|- style="background:#cfc"
| 55 || May 31 || @ Pirates ||6–5 (14) || McFarland (3–0) || Mariñez (0–3) || — || 20,990 || 33–22 ||W2
|-

|- style="background:#cfc"
| 56 || June 1 || @ Marlins ||3–2 || Greinke (7–3) || Barraclough (1–1) || Rodney (14)  || 16,433 || 34–22 ||W3
|- style="background:#fbb"
| 57 || June 2 || @ Marlins ||5–7 || McGowan (3–0) || Corbin (4–6) || Ramos (7) || 17,413 || 34–23 ||L1
|- style="background:#fbb"
| 58 || June 3 || @ Marlins ||0–3 || Volquez (2–7) || Delgado (1–1) || — || 21,548 || 34–24 ||L2
|- style="background:#fbb"
| 59 || June 4 || @ Marlins ||5–6 || Wittgren (1–0) || De La Rosa (2–1) || Ramos (8) || 20,387 || 34–25 ||L3
|- style="background:#cfc"
| 60 || June 6 || Padres ||10–2 || Ray (6–3) || Lamet (2–1) || — || 25,883 || 35–25 || W1
|- style="background:#cfc"
| 61 || June 7 || Padres ||7–4 || Greinke (8–3) || Perdomo (0–3) || Rodney (15) || 22,079 || 36–25 || W2
|- style="background:#cfc"
| 62 || June 8 || Padres || 15–3 || Corbin (5–6) || Richard (4–7) || — || 21,340 || 37–25 || W3
|- style="background:#fbb"
| 63 || June 9 || Brewers ||6–8 || Davies (7–3) || McFarland (3–1) || Knebel (8) || 25,009 || 37–26 || L1
|- style="background:#cfc"
| 64 || June 10 || Brewers || 3–2 || Godley (2–1) || Guerra (1–1) || Rodney (16) || 40,195 || 38–26 || W1
|- style="background:#cfc"
| 65 || June 11 || Brewers ||11–1 || Ray (7–3) ||Anderson (5–2) || — || 30,370 || 39–26 || W2
|- style="background:#cfc"
| 66 || June 13 || @ Tigers || 7–6 || Bradley (2–1) || J. Wilson (2–2) || Rodney (17) || 25,119 || 40–26 || W3
|- style="background:#cfc"
| 67 || June 14 || @ Tigers || 2–1 || Walker (5–3) || Zimmermann (5–5) || Rodney (18) || 26,134 || 41–26 || W4
|- style="background:#cfc"
| 68 || June 16 || @ Phillies || 5–4 || Corbin (6–6) || Nola (3–5) || Rodney (19) || 18,140 || 42–26 || W5
|- style="background:#cfc"
| 69 || June 17 || @ Phillies || 5–1 || De La Rosa (3–1) || Ramos (0–4) || — || 21,108 || 43–26 || W6
|- style="background:#cfc"
| 70 || June 18 || @ Phillies || 5–4 (12) || Bradley (3–1) || Gomez (3–2) || Rodney (20) || 31,131 || 44–26 || W7
|- style="background:#fbb"
| 71 || June 20 || @ Rockies || 3–4 || Ottavino (1–1) || Greinke (8–4) || Holland (25) || 35,016 || 44–27 || L1
|- style="background:#cfc"
| 72 || June 21 || @ Rockies || 16–5 || Walker (6–3) || Hoffman (4–1) || — || 40,918 || 45–27 || W1
|- style="background:#cfc"
| 73 || June 22 || @ Rockies || 10–3 || Godley (3–1) || Senzatela (9–3) || — || 40,681 || 46–27 || W2
|- style="background:#fbb"
| 74 || June 23 || Phillies || 1–6 || Leiter Jr. (1–0) || Corbin (6–7) || — || 31,648 || 46–28 || L1
|- style="background:#cfc"
| 75 || June 24 || Phillies || 9–2 || Ray (8–3) || Lively (1–2) || — || 40,557 || 47–28 || W1
|- style="background:#cfc"
| 76 || June 25 || Phillies || 2–1 (11) || McFarland (4–1) || Ramos (0–7) || — || 28,179 || 48–28 || W2
|- style="background:#cfc"
| 77 || June 26 || Phillies || 6–1 || Greinke (9–4) || Pivetta (1–4) || — || 20,765 || 49–28 || W3
|- style="background:#cfc"
| 78 || June 27 || Cardinals || 6–5 (10) || Rodney (2–2) || Bowman (1–3) || — || 24,256 || 50–28 || W4
|- style="background:#fbb"
| 79 || June 28 || Cardinals || 3–4 || Wainwright (8–5) || Godley (3–2) || Rosenthal (4) || 23,188 || 50–29 || L1
|- style="background:#fbb"
| 80 || June 29 || Cardinals || 4–10 || Lynn (6–5) || De La Rosa (0–1)  || — || 27,603 || 50–30 || L2
|- style="background:#fbb"
| 81 || June 30 || Rockies || 3–6 || Gray (1–0) || Ray (8–4) || Holland (26) || 23,275 || 50–31 || L3
|-

|- style="background:#cfc"
| 82 || July 1 || Rockies|| 6–2 || Greinke (10–4) || Chatwood (6–9) || — || 46,338 || 51–31 || W1
|- style="background:#cfc"
| 83 || July 2 || Rockies || 4–3 || Rodney (3–2) || Ottavino (1–3) || — || 34,556 || 52–31 || W2
|- style="background:#fbb"
| 84 || July 4 || @ Dodgers || 3–4 || Kershaw (13–2) || Corbin (6–8)  || Jansen (19) || 53,159 || 52–32 || L1
|- style="background:#fbb"
| 85 || July 5 || @ Dodgers || 0–1 || Wood (10–0) || Godley (3–3)  || Jansen (20) || 40,997 || 52–33 || L2
|- style="background:#fbb"
| 86 || July 6 || @ Dodgers || 4–5 || Fields (4–0) || Rodney (3–3)  || — || 41,999 || 52–34 || L3
|- style="background:#cfc"
| 87 || July 7 || Reds || 6–3 || Greinke (11–4) || Adleman (5–6) || Rodney (22) || 27,006 || 53–34 || W1
|- style="background:#fbb"
| 88 || July 8 || Reds || 0–7 || Castillo (1–0) || Walker (6–4) || — || 29,806 || 53–35 || L1
|- style="background:#fbb"
| 89 || July 9 || Reds || 1–2 || Bailey (2–2) || Corbin (6–9) || Iglesias (16) || 24,923 || 53–36 || L2
|- style="text-align:center; background:#bbcaff;"
| colspan="10" |88th All-Star Game in Miami, Florida
|- style="background:#fbb"
| 90 || July 14 || @ Braves || 3–4 || Brothers (1–0) || Bradley (3–2) || Johnson (20) || 38,852 || 53–37 || L3
|- style="background:#fbb"
| 91 || July 15 || @ Braves || 5–8 || Krol (2–2) || Delgado (1–2) || Johnson (21) || 41,627 || 53–38 || L4
|- style="background:#fbb"
| 92 || July 16 || @ Braves || 1–7 || García (3–7) || Godley (3–4) || — || 36,637 || 53–39 || L5
|- style="background:#cfc"
| 93 || July 18 || @ Reds || 11–2 || Ray (9–4) || Romano (1–2) || — || 19,989 || 54–39 || W1
|- style="background:#fbb"
| 94 || July 19 || @ Reds || 3–4 (11) || Lorenzen (5–2) || McFarland (4–2) || — || 16,573 || 54–40 || L1
|- style="background:#cfc"
| 95 || July 20 || @ Reds || 12–2 || Corbin (7–9) || Castillo (1–3) || — || 19,711 || 55–40 || W1
|- style="background:#cfc"
| 96 || July 21 || Nationals || 7–6 || Rodney (4–3) || Romero (2–4) || — || 37,858 || 56–40 || W2
|- style="background:#fbb"
| 97 || July 22 || Nationals|| 3–4 || Roark (8–6) || Banda (0–1) || Doolittle (5) || 39,176 || 56–41 || L1
|- style="background:#fbb"
| 98 || July 23 || Nationals || 2–6 || Blanton (1–2) || Ray (9–5) || — || 32,720 || 56–42 || L2
|- style="background:#cfc"
| 99 || July 24 || Braves || 10–2 || Greinke (12–4) || Dickey (6–7) || — || 20,862 || 57–42 || W1
|- style="background:#fbb"
| 100 || July 25 || Braves || 3–8 || Foltynewicz (9–5) || Hoover (1–1) || — || 25,069 || 57–43 || L1
|- style="background:#cfc"
| 101 || July 26 || Braves|| 10–3 || Corbin (8–9) || Blair (0–1) || — || 25,836 || 58–43 || W1
|- style="background:#cfc"
| 102 || July 27 || @ Cardinals || 4–0 || Godley (4–4) || Weaver (0–1) || — || 39,208 || 59–43 || W2
|- style="background:#fbb"
| 103 || July 28 || @ Cardinals || 0–1 || Wacha (8–4) || McFarland (4–3) || Rosenthal (5) || 41,230 || 59–44 || L1
|- style="background:#cfc"
| 104 || July 29 || @ Cardinals || 7–1 || Greinke (13–4) || Leake (7–9) || — || 48,052 || 60–44 || W1
|- style="background:#fbb"
| 105 || July 30 || @ Cardinals || 2–3 || Lynn (9–6) || Walker (6–5) || Rosenthal (6) || 40,827 || 60–45 || L1
|-

|- style="background:#fbb"
| 106 || August 1 || @ Cubs || 4–16 || Rondon (3–1) || Corbin (8–10) || Montgomery (3) || 40,709 || 60–46 || L2
|- style="background:#cfc"
| 107 || August 2 || @ Cubs || 3–0 || Godley (5–4) || Arrieta (10–8) || Rodney (23) || 41,321 || 61–46 || W1
|- style="background:#cfc"
| 108 || August 3 || @ Cubs || 10–8 || Barrett (1–0) || Davis (2–1) || Rodney (24) || 39,525 || 62–46 || W2
|- style="background:#cfc"
| 109 || August 4 || @ Giants || 2–1 || Banda (1–1) || Bumgarner (1–5) || Rodney (25) || 38,967 || 63–46 || W3
|- style="background:#fbb"
| 110 || August 5 || @ Giants || 4–5 (10) || Strickland (2–2) || McFarland (4–4) || — || 39,532 || 63–47 || L1
|- style="background:#fbb"
| 111 || August 6 || @ Giants || 3–6 || Samardzija (7–11) || Corbin (8–11) || Suárez (1) || 40,107 || 63–48 || L2
|- style="background:#cfc"
| 112 || August 8 || Dodgers || 6–3 || Hernandez (2–0) || Watson (5–4) || Rodney (26) || 24,810 || 64–48 || W1
|- style="background:#fbb"
| 113 || August 9 || Dodgers || 2–3 || Wood (14–1) || Greinke (13–5) || Jansen (29) || 22,670 || 64–49 || L1
|- style="background:#fbb"
| 114 || August 10 || Dodgers || 6–8 || Darvish (8–9) || Banda (1–2) || Jansen (30) || 31,396 || 64–50 || L2
|- style="background:#fbb"
| 115 || August 11 || Cubs || 3–8 || Lackey (10–9) || Walker (6–6) || — || 39,131 || 64–51 || L3
|- style="background:#cfc"
| 116 || August 12 || Cubs || 6–2 || Corbin (9–11) || Lester (8–7) || Hernandez (2) || 42,219 || 65–51 || W1
|- style="background:#fbb"
| 117 || August 13 || Cubs || 2–7 || Arrieta (12–8) || Godley (5–5) || — || 41,760 || 65–52 || L1
|- style="background:#cfc"
| 118 || August 14 || Astros || 2–0 || Greinke (14–5) || McHugh (0–2) || Rodney (27) || 20,405 || 66–52 || W1
|- style="background:#fbb"
| 119 || August 15 || Astros || 4–9 || Martes (5–2) || Banda (1–3) || — || 16,935 || 66–53 ||L1
|- style="background:#fbb"
| 120 || August 16 || @ Astros || 5–9 || Morton (10–5) || Walker (6–7) || — || 27,278 || 66–54 ||L2
|- style="background:#cfc"
| 121 || August 17 || @ Astros || 4–0 || Corbin (10–11) || Fiers (7–8) || — || 27,949 || 67–54 || W1
|- style="background:#fbb"
| 122 || August 18 || @ Twins || 3–10 || Santana (13–7) || Godley (6–7) || — || 25,830 || 67–55 || L1
|- style="background:#fbb"
| 123 || August 19 || @ Twins || 0–5 || Berríos (11–5) || Greinke (14–6) || — || 29,456 || 67–56 || L2
|- style="background:#fbb"
| 124 || August 20 || @ Twins || 5–12 || Colón (5–10) || McFarland (4–5) || — || 27,367 || 67–57 || L3
|- style="background:#cfc"
| 125 || August 21 || @ Mets || 3–2 (10) || Sherfy (1–0) || Goeddel (0–1) || Rodney (28) || 24,265 || 68–57 || W1
|- style="background:#cfc"
| 126 || August 22 || @ Mets || 7–4 || Corbin (11–11) || Milone (1–3) || Rodney (29) || 25,220 || 69–57 || W2
|- style="background:#fbb"
| 127 || August 23 || @ Mets || 2–4 || Flexen (3–2) || Godley (5–7) || Ramos (23) || 31,277 || 69–58 || L1
|- style="background:#cfc"
| 128 || August 24 || @ Mets || 3–2 || Ray (10–5) || Montero (2–9) || Rodney (30) || 25,284 || 70–58 || W1
|- style="background:#cfc"
| 129 || August 25 || Giants || 4–3 || Greinke (15–6) || Blach (8–10) || Rodney (31) || 31,924 || 71–58 || W2
|- style="background:#cfc"
| 130 || August 26 || Giants || 2–1 || Walker (7–7) || Bumgarner (3–6) || Rodney (32) || 25,709 || 72–58 || W3
|- style="background:#cfc"
| 131 || August 27 || Giants || 11–0 || Corbin (12–11) || Stratton (2–3) || — || 23,210 || 73–58 || W4
|- style="background:#cfc"
| 132 || August 29 || Dodgers || 7–6 || Godley (6–7) || Hill (9–6) || Rodney (33) || 25,219 || 74–58 || W5
|- style="background:#cfc"
| 133 || August 30 || Dodgers || 6–4 || Ray (11–5) || Ryu (5–7)  || Rodney (34) ||23,321 || 75–58 || W6
|- style="background:#cfc"
| 134 || August 31 || Dodgers || 8–1 || Greinke (16–6) || Maeda (12–6) || — || 19,882 || 76–58 || W7
|-

|- style="background:#cfc"
| 135 || September 1 || @ Rockies || 9–5 || Walker (8–7) || Freeland (11–9) || — || 29,628 || 77–58 || W8
|- style="background:#cfc"
| 136 || September 2 || @ Rockies || 6–2 || Corbin (13–11) || Gray (6–4) || — || 39,442 || 78–58 || W9
|- style="background:#cfc"
| 137 || September 3 || @ Rockies || 5–1 || Godley (7–7) || Marquez (10–6) || Sherfy (1) || 33,838 || 79–58 || W10
|- style="background:#cfc"
| 138 || September 4 || @ Dodgers || 13–0 || Ray (12–5) || Hill (9–7) || — || 47,192 || 80–58 || W11
|- style="background:#cfc"
| 139 || September 5 || @ Dodgers || 3–1 (10) || Hernandez (3–0) || Báez (3–4) || Rodney (35) || 47,039 || 81–58 || W12
|- style="background:#cfc"
| 140 || September 6 || @ Dodgers || 3–1 || Walker (9–7) || Avilán (2–2) || Rodney (36) || 48,612 || 82–58 || W13
|- style="background:#fbb"
| 141 || September 8 || Padres || 6–10 || Lyles (1–2) || Corbin (13–12) || — || 27,988 || 82–59 || L1
|- style="background:#fbb"
| 142 || September 9 || Padres || 7–8 || Maton (3–0) || Rodney (4–4) || Hand (17) || 34,156 || 82–60 || L2
|- style="background:#cfc"
| 143 || September 10 || Padres || 3–2 || Ray (13–5) || Perdomo (7–10) || Bradley (1) || 23,854 || 83–60 || W1
|- style="background:#fbb"
| 144 || September 11 || Rockies || 4–5 || Anderson (4–5) || Barrett (1–1) || Holland (40) || 24,178 || 83–61 || L1
|- style="background:#fbb"
| 145 || September 12 || Rockies || 2–4 || Gray (8–4) || Hernandez (3–1) || Rusin (2) || 27,526 || 83–62 || L2
|- style="background:#cfc"
| 146 || September 13 || Rockies || 8–1 || Corbin (14–12) || Marquez (10–7) || — || 26,714 || 84–62 || W1
|- style="background:#cfc"
| 147 || September 14 || Rockies || 7–0 || Godley (8–7) || Bettis (1–3) || — || 20,317 || 85–62 || W2
|- style="background:#cfc"
| 148 || September 15 || @ Giants || 3–2 || Ray (14–5) || Samardzija (9–14) || Rodney (37) || 39,810 || 86–62 || W3
|- style="background:#cfc"
| 149 || September 16 || @ Giants || 2–0 || Greinke (17–6) || Bumgarner (3–9) || Rodney (38) || 37,846 || 87–62 || W4
|- style="background:#fbb"
| 150 || September 17 || @ Giants  || 2–7 || Stratton (3–3) || Walker (9–8) || — || 38,476 || 87–63 || L1
|- style="background:#fbb"
| 151|| September 18 || @ Padres || 2–4 || Perdomo (8–10) || Corbin (14–13) || Hand (19) || 20,199 || 87–64 || L2 
|- style="background:#fbb"
| 152 || September 19 || @ Padres || 2–6 ||  Wood (4–6) ||  Godley (8–8) || — ||  20,101 || 87–65 || L3
|- style="background:#cfc"
| 153 || September 20 || @ Padres || 13–7 || Sherfy (2–0) || Stammen (2–3) || — || 25,797 || 88–65 || W1
|- style="background:#cfc"
| 154 || September 22 || Marlins || 13–11 || Hoover (2–1) || McGowan (8–2) || Rodney (39) || 34,588 || 89–65 || W2
|- style="background:#fbb"
| 155 || September 23 || Marlins || 6–12 || Ellington (1–1) || Walker (9–9) || — || 39,259 || 89–66 || L1
|- style="background:#cfc"
| 156 || September 24 || Marlins || 3–2 || Rodney (5–4) || Nicolino (2–3) || — || 31,539 || 90–66 || W1
|- style="background:#fbb"
| 157 || September 25 || Giants|| 2–9 || Cueto (8–8) || Godley (8–9) || — || 22,813 || 90–67 || L1
|- style="background:#cfc"
| 158 || September 26 || Giants || 11–4 || Ray (15–5) || Moore (6–15) || — || 27,487 || 91–67 || W1
|- style="background:#cfc"
| 159 || September 27 || Giants || 4–3 || Hoover (3–1) || Dyson (3–3) || — || 20,048 || 92–67 || W2
|- style="background:#fbb"
| 160 || September 29 || @ Royals || 1–2 || Kennedy (5–13) || Greinke (17–7) || Minor (5) || 23,488 || 92–68 || L1
|- style="background:#fbb"
|161|| September 30 || @ Royals || 3–4 || Junis (9–3) || Bradley (3–3) || Minor (6) || 32,727 || 92–69 || L2
|- style="background:#cfc"
|162|| October 1 || @ Royals || 14–2 || Banda (2–3) || Vargas (18–11) || — || 32,277 || 93–69 || W1 
|-

|-
| Legend:       = Win       = Loss       = PostponementBold = Diamondbacks team member

Playoffs
Making it to the playoffs for the first time since 2011, the Diamondbacks played their first series as a Wild Card team by playing against the Colorado Rockies on October 4, 2017. That night, Archie Bradley became the first relief pitcher and sixth pitcher in MLB history to record a triple in a postseason game. The play was considered a major highlight in their first Wild Card game in franchise history, winning 11–8 that night at home. The Diamondbacks also became the first team to record 4 triples in a single playoff game since the Boston Americans in the 1903 World Series. They subsequently lost to the Dodgers in the NLDS.

Postseason game log

|-style="background:#cfc
| 1 || October 4 || Rockies || 11–8 || Chafin (1–0) || Gray (0–1) || — || 48,803 || 1–0 
|-

|-style="background:#fbb
| 1 || October 6 || @ Dodgers || 5–9 || Kershaw (1–0) || Walker (0–1) || — || 54,707 || 0–1
|-style="background:#fbb
| 2 || October 7 || @ Dodgers || 5–8 || Maeda (1–0) || Ray (0–1) || Jansen (1) || 54,726 || 0–2
|- style="background:#fbb
| 3 || October 9 || Dodgers || 1–3 || Darvish (1–0) || Greinke' (0–1) || Jansen (2) || 48,641 || 0–3
|-

Postseason rosters

| style="text-align:left" |
Pitchers: 21 Zack Greinke 25 Archie Bradley 29 Jorge de la Rosa 38 Robbie Ray 40 Andrew Chafin 46 Patrick Corbin 47 David Hernandez 52 Zack Godley 54 Jimmie Sherfy 56 Fernando Rodney   
Catchers: 2 Jeff Mathis 8 Chris Iannetta 10 Chris Herrmann   
Infielders: 3 Daniel Descalso 4 Ketel Marte 9 Adam Rosales 22 Jake Lamb 27 Brandon Drury 44 Paul Goldschmidt 45 Kristopher Negrón    
Outfielders: 5 Gregor Blanco 6 David Peralta 11 A. J. Pollock 14 Reymond Fuentes 28 J. D. Martinez
|- valign="top"

| style="text-align:left" |
Pitchers: 21 Zack Greinke 25 Archie Bradley 29 Jorge de la Rosa 38 Robbie Ray 40 Andrew Chafin 46 Patrick Corbin 47 David Hernandez 52 Zack Godley 54 Jimmie Sherfy 56 Fernando Rodney 99 Taijuan Walker 
Catchers: 2 Jeff Mathis 8 Chris Iannetta 
Infielders: 3 Daniel Descalso 4 Ketel Marte 9 Adam Rosales 22 Jake Lamb 27 Brandon Drury 44 Paul Goldschmidt 45 Kristopher Negrón 53 Christian Walker 
Outfielders: 5 Gregor Blanco 6 David Peralta 11 A. J. Pollock 28 J. D. Martinez
|- valign="top"

Roster

Awards
First baseman Paul Goldschmidt won his third Silver Slugger Award as the best offensive player at his position in the National League.

Farm system

See also
 List of Major League Baseball single-game home run leaders

References

External links
2017 Arizona Diamondbacks season at Baseball Reference

Arizona Diamondbacks
Arizona Diamondbacks
Arizona Diamondbacks seasons